The 72nd Intelligence, Surveillance, and Reconnaissance Squadron (72 ISRS) is a United States Space Force unit assigned to Space Operations Command's Space Delta 7. It provides intelligence support to the United States Space Command and other unified combatant commands. Headquartered at Peterson Space Force Base, Colorado, it was originally activated as the 18th Intelligence Squadron, Detachment 1 on 6 January 2020 and as a squadron on 11 September 2020.

List of commanders 

 Lt Col Kimberly Templer, 11 September 2020

See also 
 Space Delta 7

References

External links 
 

Military education and training in the United States
Squadrons of the United States Space Force
Military units and formations established in 2020
Military units and formations in Colorado
2020 establishments in Colorado